Sbitenshchik (Russian: сбитенщик) was a sbiten vendor and was spread in Old Rus' regions of Novgorod, Kiev, Moscow and other Rus' cities and regions. The vendor was used for the preparation and serving of the traditional honey-based beverage sbiten in Rus' that has been around since the 12th century. The vendor was normally used in winter as the drink was prepared in wintertime. Sbitenshchik was used in Rus' principalities often on the streets to cook the drink and to sell it to the freezing people. The vendor is documented in the Russian Lubok prints. Sbitenshchik became 1783 the main theme of the popular comic opera The Sbiten Vendor by Yakov Knyazhnin with music by Czech composer Antoine Bullant.

References

Teaware
Boilers (cookware)
Russian culture